Pegasus Project may refer to:

 A highway construction project on Interstate 30 and Interstate 35E (Texas) in Dallas, Texas
 The Pegasus Project, an episode in season 10 of American-Canadian television series Stargate SG-1
 Pegasus Project (investigation), reporting on Pegasus spyware
 Project Pegasus (comics), a fictional scientific base in Marvel comics and other media